Priozernoye is a rural locality (a selo) in Srednebelsky Selsoviet of Ivanovsky District, Amur Oblast, Russia. The population was 184 as of 2018. There are 7 streets.

Geography 
Priozernoye is located 49 km north of Ivanovka (the district's administrative centre) by road. Srednebelaya is the nearest rural locality.

References 

Rural localities in Ivanovsky District, Amur Oblast